In Greek mythology, Adrasteia (Ancient Greek: Ἀδράστεια (Ionic Greek: Ἀδρήστεια), "inescapable"), Adrastea, Adrestea or Adrestia (Ἀδρήστεια) may refer to:

 Adrasteia, a nymph who helped raise the infant Zeus.
An epithet for Nemesis, Goddess of Vengeance.

See also 

 Adrastea, a name for the Orphic goddess Ananke.

Notes

References 

Apollodorus, The Library with an English Translation by Sir James George Frazer, F.B.A., F.R.S. in 2 Volumes, Cambridge, MA, Harvard University Press; London, William Heinemann Ltd. 1921. ISBN 0-674-99135-4. Online version at the Perseus Digital Library. Greek text available from the same website.
Gaius Julius Hyginus, Fabulae from The Myths of Hyginus translated and edited by Mary Grant. University of Kansas Publications in Humanistic Studies. Online version at the Topos Text Project.

Greek goddesses